The Great Southern and Western Railway (GS&WR) Class 21 (Or perhaps more simply engine numbers 21 to 40) consisted of half of the initial order of 40 passenger locomotives ordered for the GS&WR and which entered service between approximately 1845 and 1847.  A number were later rebuilt to 2-4-0 locomotives for goods work.

There were suggestions it was able to achieve  downhill on Ballybrophy bank but climbing out of Kingsbridge towards Inchicore on a wet day might require the fireman to walk alongside shovelling sand under the wheels to prevent slipping.

Notes and references

Notes

References

2-2-2 locomotives
5 ft 3 in gauge locomotives

Steam locomotives of Ireland